Fino del Monte is a comune (municipality) in the Province of Bergamo in the Italian region of Lombardy, located about  northeast of Milan and about  northeast of Bergamo.

Fino del Monte borders the following municipalities: Castione della Presolana, Onore, Rovetta, Songavazzo.

Demographic evolution

References